The 9th Parliament of Kiribati is the current term of the House of Assembly of Kiribati. It was determined by the 2007 parliamentary election.

The 9th Parliament consists in 44 representatives, elected from 23 single-seat or multi-seat constituencies.

The parliamentary website notes that, although political parties exist, they are "loose groupings rather than disciplined blocks, with little or no structure. Members may change allegiance on a number of occasions during their tenure. It is also common for members to vote according to the special interests of their electorate on certain issues". Consequently, representatives' party membership is not listed on the parliamentary website.

Members

Below are the current 2016-2020, 45 Members of the Maneaba ni Maungatabu (MM)

The following are the previous years' 44 members of the National Parliament.

References

Politics of Kiribati
Political organisations based in Kiribati
Government of Kiribati